The Kreuzer-Pelton House is a Dutch-influenced fieldstone house on Staten Island in New York City. Erected in 1722 as a one-room cottage, it was expanded in two stages: in 1770 and in 1836.  It is designated as a New York City landmark. The house was built by Joseph Rolph.

During the American Revolutionary War, Tory militia commander Cortlandt Skinner used the house as his headquarters. William IV of the United Kingdom was a guest at the house.

See also 
List of New York City Designated Landmarks in Staten Island
National Register of Historic Places listings in Richmond County, New York

References 
 Neighborhood Preservation Center

Houses on the National Register of Historic Places in Staten Island
Houses completed in 1722
New York City Designated Landmarks in Staten Island
1722 establishments in the Province of New York
West New Brighton, Staten Island